Røst Church is a parish church of the Church of Norway in Røst Municipality in Nordland county, Norway. It is located in the village of Røstlandet on the island of Røstlandet. It is the church for the Røst parish which is part of the Bodø domprosti (deanery) in the Diocese of Sør-Hålogaland. The white, wooden church was built in a long church style in 1900 using plans drawn up by the architect A. Evjen. The church seats about 270 people. The building was consecrated on 26 September 1900.

History
Historical records first show a church in Røst in 1432, although the records show the church was not new at that time. The church in Røst changed locations over the centuries. (The site of the medieval church today is mostly underwater in a swampy area. The is likely because the old rock wall surrounding the churchyard has sunk into the soft ground and is likely holding in the water and preventing normal drainage. This has led to the legend of the old church sinking into the ground.) This church burned down in 1715.

The church was torn down in 1785 and rebuilt on the same site. Around the year 1824, the church was struck by lightning and it was badly burned in the resulting fire. Then in January 1835, the church was destroyed in a large winter storm. It was consecrated on 5 May 1839. In 1883, a new choir and sacristy were built on to the building.

Media gallery

See also
List of churches in Sør-Hålogaland

References

Røst
Churches in Nordland
Wooden churches in Norway
19th-century Church of Norway church buildings
Churches completed in 1899
13th-century establishments in Norway
Long churches in Norway